Caught is the tenth stand-alone novel by American crime writer Harlan Coben. It was released in 2010.

Plot 
17-year-old Haley McWaid is a good girl, the pride of her suburban New Jersey family, captain of the lacrosse team, headed off to college next year with all the hopes and dreams her doting parents can pin on her. Which is why, when her mother wakes one morning to find that Haley never came home the night before, and three months quickly pass without word from the girl, the community assumes the worst.

List of characters
Harlan Coben novels include many characters (too many, according to Janet Maslin). Sometimes this is confusing for the reader. This list will help to identify the characters in the novel.

Main Characters 
 Dan Mercer - social worker known as a friend to troubled teens / he walks into a trap of TV news program "Caught in the Act"
 Wendy Tynes - reporter / presenter at NTC News
 Haley McWaid - oldest daughter of Marcia and Ted McWaid / suddenly missing
 Ed Grayson - one of the fathers of families whose child that has been abused / pensioned federal Marshall
 Phil Turnball - one of Dan Mercer's flatmate during Princeton university; worked at investment company, but jobless due to rumors of fraud
 Frank Tremont - police detective Essex County; early 60s nearing retirement
 Mickey Walker - Sheriff Sussex County

Other characters (alphabetical) 
 Amanda Wheeler - stepdaughter of Jenna Wheeler / classmate of Haley McWaid
 Ariana Nasbro - alcoholic who killed Wendy's husband John 12 years ago
 Arthur Lemaine - ice hockey coach / brother-in-law of Ed Grayson / shot in both knees
 Charlie - 17-year-old son of Wendy
 Christa Stockwell - 40 years old / lives in home of Dean at Princeton
 Chynna - young girl in "Caught in the Act"
 Doug - dressed as a tennis professional
 Ed Junior "EJ" - son of Ed and Maggie
 Farley Parks - flatmate of Dan during University / candidate of Congress, but in trouble due to political sex scandal
 Flair Hickory - attorney of Dan Mercer
 Hester Crimstein - TV-judge and attorney of Ed Grayson
 Jenna Wheeler - ex-wife of Dan Mercer; since eight years remarried with:
 Jersey - Wendy's dog
 John Morrow - made Wendy pregnant at her 19th; married for five years when killed by a drunk driver Ariana Nasbro
 Kelvin Tilfer - flatmate of Dan during University / black / genius / psychiatric patient
 Lee Portnoi - attorney of Wendy Tynes
 Maggie - wife of Ed Grayson
 Marcia McWaid - mother of Haley, Patricia and Ryan
 Michelle Fischer - young new TV news presenter
 Noel Wheeler - surgeon
 Norm alias "Ten-a-fly" - member of Father's Club / now wannabe rapper
 Patricia McWaid - 14 years old
 Pops - father of John; (ex-) father in law of Wendy
 Ridley Barry - co-founder of Barry Brothers Trust, where Phil Turnbull has worked before he was fired
 Ryan McWaid - Nine years old
 Sherry Turnball - Phil's wife
 Steven Miciano - flatmate of Dan during University / orthopedic surgeon / accused of possession of drugs
 Ted McWaid - father of Haley, Patricia and Ryan
 Tom Stanton - young policeman / deputy sheriff
 Vic Garrett - Wendy's Boss at NTC News
 Windsor "Win" Horne Lockwood, III - He is the secondary character in the Myron Bolitar series. While the best friend of hero Bolitar, Win would best be described as an anti-hero, being very psychopathic in nature. In "Caught" Wendy calls Win for confidential information

Secondary characters (alphabetical) 
 Frederik Montagne - a high boss of the NTC Network
 Greg - son of Hal and Marilee
 Hal - married with Marilee
 Kasey - daughter of Frank Tremont, that died at 17 years of age from cancer
 Kirby Sennett - a boyfriend of Hailey McWaid
 Lawrence Cherston - Princeton jup / moderator of Princeton Facebook pager
 Loren Muse - boss of Frank Tremont
 Marilee - sister of Marcia McWaid
 Mavis - secretary of Vic Garett
 Michael Wind - childhood friend of Pete Zecher
 Michelle Fischer - young new TV news presenter
 Noel Wheeler - surgeon
 Norm alias "Ten-a-fly" - member of Father's Club / now wannabe rapper
 Patricia McWaid - 14 years old
 Pete Zecher - school dean
 Pops - father of John; (ex-) father in law of Wendy
 Ridley Barry - co-founder of Barry Brothers Trust, where Phil Turnbull has worked before he was fired
 Ronal Tilfer - brother of Kelvin Tilfer
 Ryan McWaid - Nine years old
 Sharon Hait - Facebook alias of Wendy Tynes
 Sherry Turnball - Phil's wife
 Stephe Slotnick - dean at Princeton
 Steven Miciano - flatmate of Dan during University / orthopedic surgeon / accused of possession of drugs
 Tara O'Neill - pathologist
 Ted McWaid - father of Haley, Patricia and Ryan
 Tom Stanton - young policeman / deputy sheriff
 Vic Garrett - Wendy's Boss at NTC News

Dan Mercers' Flat mates in University 
 Phil Turnball
 Farley Parks
 Kelvin Tilfer
 Steven Miciano

The Fathers Club (meeting place: Starbucks) 
 Phil Turnball
 Norm (Ten-a-Fly)
 Doug
 Owen

References 

2010 American novels
Novels by Harlan Coben
American crime novels
American thriller novels
E. P. Dutton books